H.E Hon. James Charles Nakhwanga Osogo EGH is a Kenyan politician.

Early life and education
Nakhwanga Osogo was born on 10 October 1932 in Bukani Village of Budalangi District in Kenya.He was educated 1941-1943 Port Victoria Primary; 1944-1949 St. Mary's Secondary School, Yala; and 1950-1951 Railways Training School, Nairobi.

Career
Nakhwanga Osogo qualified as assistant station master; 1951-1953 assistant station master Kenya and Uganda; 1953-1954 Kagumo Teacher's Training College P2 certificate; 1955-1959 teacher at various schools in Kenya; 1960 headmaster Kibasanga School; 1961 headmaster Nangina School; 1963 elected Member House of Representatives for Ruwambwa; 1964-1966 Assistant Minister for Agriculture; 1966-1969 Minister for Information and Broadcasting; 1969-1973 Minister for Commerce and Industry; May 1970 concurrently Minister for Agriculture, 1973-1974 Minister for Local Government; 1974 Minister for Health; concurrently minister for Foreign Affairs; 1978 deputy leader of Government Business; 1979 Minister for Agriculture; 1980 Minister for Livestock.
Awarded Elder, Order of the Golden Heart (Kenya); Grand Cordon of the Star of Ethiopia; Order of the Star of Africa (Liberia); Grand Cross of the Star Yugoslav Flag (1st Class).

References

1932 births
Living people
Members of the National Assembly (Kenya)
Ministers of Agriculture of Kenya